Middle Stoner Lake is an oligotrophic lake that is located north of Canada Lake, New York. It is one of three lakes that make up the Stoner Lake system. Fish species present in the lake are pickerel, black bullhead, largemouth bass, yellow perch, and sunfish. There is carry down access at the bridge off NY-10 on the north shore.

References

Lakes of New York (state)
Lakes of Fulton County, New York